Digor is a district of Kars Province in the Eastern Anatolia region of Turkey. The population of the town is 2,647. The mayor is Nebi Kerenciler (AKP).

Notable People 

 Mahmut Alınak (1952*), Kurdish Politician

See also 
Tekor Basilica
Digoron People
Yazidis in Armenia

References

External links
 Governor's Office for Digor

Towns in Turkey
Populated places in Kars Province
Districts of Kars Province
Kurdish settlements in Turkey